Prunus subg. Padus is a subgenus of Prunus, characterised by having racemose inflorescences. Padus was originally a distinct genus, but genetic and morphological studies have shown that Padus is polyphyletic. It has been proposed that all the racemose taxa within Prunus (Padus, Maddenia, Laurocerasus and Pygeum) are incorporated into a broad-sense Prunus subg. Padus. However, this broad-sense Prunus subg. Padus is not monophyletic either.

Species

Padus 
Species formerly included in the genus Padus are mostly incorporated into this subgenus, except P. maackii and P. xingshanensis which are included in Prunus subg. Cerasus. They are deciduous and have small, sour fruit usually only palatable to birds, hence the name bird cherries. Bird cherries are native throughout the temperate Northern Hemisphere, including:
Prunus brachypoda – China
Prunus brunnescens – Sichuan and Yunnan
Prunus buergeriana – Buerger's bird cherry, East Asia and Himalaya
Prunus cornuta – Himalayan bird cherry, Himalaya
Prunus grayana – Gray's bird cherry, China and Japan
Prunus gyirongensis entire-leaved bird cherry, Tibet
Prunus napaulensis Nepalese bird cherry, China and Himalaya
Prunus obtusata - China
Prunus padus – bird cherry or Eurasian bird cherry, Eurasia
Prunus perulata – Sichuan and Yunnan
Prunus serotina – black cherry, North America
Prunus ssiori – Hokkaido bird cherry, Japan and Sakhalin
Prunus stellipila – China
Prunus velutina – China
Prunus virginiana – chokecherry, North America
Prunus wilsonii – Wilson's bird cherry, China

Maddenia 
They are similar to bird cherries but lack petals. There are three species:
 Prunus himalayana (synonym: Prunus gongshanensis) – Himalayan false bird cherry, southwestern China, Myanmar, Himalaya
 Prunus hypoleuca (synonyms: Prunus fujianensis, Prunus incisoserrata) – false bird cherry, China
 Prunus hypoxantha – Sichuan false bird cherry, western to central China

Laurocerasus 
Species formerly included in the genus Laurocerasus (cherry laurels) are evergreen and distributed in subtropics and tropics. Examples are:
 Prunus amplifolia
 Prunus brittoniana
 Prunus caroliniana
 Prunus ilicifolia
 Prunus integrifolia
 Prunus javanica
 Prunus laurocerasus
 Prunus lusitanica
 Prunus myrtifolia
 Prunus oblonga
 Prunus occidentalis
 Prunus oleifolia
 Prunus phaeosticta
 Prunus reflexa
 Prunus spinulosa
 Prunus tucumanensis
 Prunus undulata

Pygeum 
The Pygeum group is monophyletic if P. africana (possibly as well as P. crassifolia) is excluded. All the species formerly included in the genus Pygeum, except P. africana, are native to tropical Asia and Oceania. They are similar to cherry laurels but lack petals. Examples are: 
 Prunus africana
 Prunus arborea
 Prunus ceylanica
 Prunus costata
 Prunus crassifolia
 Prunus dolichobotrys
 Prunus gazelle-peninsulae
 Prunus grisea
 Prunus lancilimba
 Prunus malayana
 Prunus oligantha
 Prunus oocarpa
 Prunus polystachya
 Prunus pullei
 Prunus schlechteri
 Prunus turneriana
 Prunus wallaceana

References

External links
North Dakota State University agriculture information page about Prunus virginiana 

 
Padus
Cherries
Plant subgenera